Philip Davitt (May 23, 1931 – October 21, 1994) was an American politician who served in the Iowa House of Representatives from 1977 to 1985.

He died of a heart attack on October 21, 1994, in Bella Vista, Arkansas at age 63.

References

1931 births
1994 deaths
Democratic Party members of the Iowa House of Representatives